Roxana is an unincorporated community in Paulding County, Georgia, United States, located on Dallas Acworth Highway near Gracepointe Church and Somerset Drive extending to the Seven Hills Community in Dallas Georgia past Seven Hills Blvd and Harmony Grove Road.  The Crossroads Community begins where Dallas Acworth Highway and Cedarcrest road intersect and includes the northeastern part of Dallas Georgia and parts of Acworth Georgia. This area includes zip codes 30132 and 30101. The Crossroads Library is located at 909 Harmony Grove Church Rd, Acworth, GA 30101, part of Paulding County.

References

Unincorporated communities in Paulding County, Georgia
Unincorporated communities in Georgia (U.S. state)